Rani Roopmati (Roopmati Rathore) was a Poet queen of Mandu and the consort of the Sultan of Malwa, Baz Bahadur. Roopmati features prominently in the folklores of Malwa, which talk about the love between the Sultan and Roopmati. Adham Khan was prompted to conquer Mandu partly due to Roopmati's beauty. When Adham Khan marched on the fort Baz Bahadur met him with his small force and was defeated, Roopmati poisoned herself. Thus ending the magical love story which was steeped in music, poetry, romance, war and death. This romance is considered a legend by some whilst others consider it to be true. Mandu is 100 KM from Indore.

Life

Baz Bahadur, ever so fond of music, was the last independent ruler of Mandu. Once out hunting, Baz Bahadur chanced upon a shepherdess frolicking and singing with her friends. Smitten by both her enchanting beauty and her melodious voice, he begged Roopmati to accompany him to his capital. Roopmati agreed to go to Mandu on the condition that she would live in a palace within sight of her beloved and venerated river, Narmada. Thus was built the Rewa Kund at Mandu.

Mughal Akbar decided to conquer Mandu. Akbar sent Adham Khan to capture Mandu and Baz bahadur went to challenge him with his small army. No match for the great Mughal army, Mandu fell easily.

Baz Bahadur fled to Chittorgarh to seek help. As Adham Khan came to Mandu, he was surprised by the beauty of Roopmati. Rani Roopmati stoically poisoned herself to avoid capture, bringing an end to the love story.

Poems by Rani Roopmati
In 1599, Ahmad-ul-Umri Turkoman, who was in the service of Sharaf-ud-Din Mirza wrote the story of Rani Roopmati in Persian. He collected 26 poems of her and included them in his work. The original manuscript passed to his grandson Fulad Khan and his friend Mir Jafar Ali made a copy of the manuscript in 1653. Mir Jafar Ali's copy ultimately passed to Mehbub Ali of Delhi and after his death in 1831 passed to a lady of Delhi. Jemadar Inayat Ali of Bhopal brought this manuscript from her to Agra. This manuscript later reached C.E. Luard and translated into English by L.M. Crump under the title, The Lady of the Lotus: Rupmati, Queen of Mandu: A Strange Tale of Faithfulness in 1926. This manuscript has a collection of twelve dohas, ten kavitas and three sawaiyas of Rupmati.

Rewa Kund and Rani Roopmati pavilion
The Rewa Kund is a reservoir built by Baz Bahadur at Mandu, equipped with an aqueduct to supply Roopmati's palace with water. Today, the site is revered as a holy spot. Baz Bahadur's Palace was constructed in the early 16th century, and is notable for its spacious courtyard fringed with halls, and high terraces which give a terrific view of the lovely surroundings. Rani Roopmati's Pavilion was built as an army observation post. It served a more romantic purpose as Roopmati's retreat. From this picturesque pavilion perched on a hilltop, the queen could gaze at her paramour's palace, and also at the Narmada flowing by, below. Rani Roopmati's double pavilion perched on the southern embattlements afforded a beautiful view of the Narmada valley.

In popular culture 
The story of Queen Roopmati has been adapted into several films in India, including: Rani Rupmati (1931) by Bhalji Pendharkar and Rani Rupmati (1959) by S.N. Tripathi starring Nirupa Roy in the titular role. Kuldip Kaur played the role of the queen, portrayed as a dacoit, in the 1952 Indian film Baiju Bawra about the titular poet during the Mughal period.

References

Notes

Bibliography

 
 
 
 
 
 
 
 
 

History of Malwa
16th-century Indian women singers
16th-century Indian singers
Indian women folk singers
Women musicians from Madhya Pradesh
16th-century Indian royalty
Indian female royalty